Cape Borley is an ice-covered cape protruding slightly from the coast midway between Cape Batterbee and Magnet Bay. It was discovered in January 1930 by the British Australian New Zealand Antarctic Research Expedition (BANZARE) under Mawson, who named it for John Oliver Borley, a member of the Discovery Committee, who assisted BANZARE with arrangements to take over the Discovery.

References
 

Headlands of Enderby Land